Lobodontus is a genus of beetles in the family Carabidae, containing the following species:

 Lobodontus ater Britton, 1937 
 Lobodontus compressus (Murray, 1857) 
 Lobodontus conjunctus Barker, 1919 
 Lobodontus metallicus Burgeon, 1937 
 Lobodontus murrayi Britton, 1937 
 Lobodontus taeniatus Basilewsky, 1970 
 Lobodontus trimaculatus Chaudoir, 1848 
 Lobodontus trisignatus Buquet, 1835 
 Lobodontus uninotatus Burgeon, 1937

References

Lebiinae